The College of Arts and Sciences is one of sixteen colleges at Ohio State University. The college is the largest at Ohio State, and is located in several buildings throughout its campus. The college is composed of 38 departments, and hosts over 80 different majors.

History 
In 1968, the college was split up into five separate colleges: the College of Arts, College of Biological Sciences, College of Humanities, College of Mathematical and Physical Sciences, and College of Social and Behavioral Sciences. University President E. Gordon Gee reunited the five colleges in 2010.

Academics 
The College offers majors in over 70 different academic disciplines. On a yearly basis, around half of all credit hours at Ohio State are earned through the College of Arts and Sciences. The College has produced 5 Churchill Scholars, 5 Goldwater Scholars, 1 Knight-Hennessy Scholar, and 5 Rhodes Scholars.

Notable alumni 

 Charles Csuri, artist
 Nancy J. Currie-Gregg, astronaut
 Steve Martino, film director
 Bebe Miller, dancer and choreographer
 Charles Newirth, American film producer
 John D. Ong, former US Ambassador to Norway
 R. L. Stine, author

References

External links 

 

Arts and Sciences, College of
Liberal arts colleges at universities in the United States